Darryl Dale Rogers (May 28, 1934 – July 10, 2018) was an American football player and coach. He served as the head coach at California State College at Hayward—now known as California State University, East Bay (1965), California State University, Fresno (1966–1972), San Jose State University (1973–1975), Michigan State University (1976–1979), and Arizona State University (1980–1984), compiling a career college football record of 129–84–7. From 1985 to 1988, Rogers was the head coach of Detroit Lions the National Football League (NFL), tallying a mark of 18–40. In 1991, served as head coach of the Winnipeg Blue Bombers of the Canadian Football League (CFL), coaching the Blue Bombers to a 9–9 record and an appearance in the East Final.

Early life and education
Born in Los Angeles, Rogers graduated from Jordan High School in Long Beach, California. After attending Long Beach City College, Rogers transferred to Fresno State College (now California State University, Fresno). At Fresno State, Rogers completed two degrees in physical education, a bachelor's degree in 1957 and master's degree in 1964. He played at end, with both wide receiver and defensive back roles, on the Fresno State Bulldogs football team in 1955 and 1956.

In the 1957 NFL draft, the Los Angeles Rams selected Rogers in the 24th round.

Coaching career
In 1961, Rogers became defensive backfield coach at Fresno City College. He served as the head coach at Cal State Hayward (now Cal State East Bay) in 1965, Fresno State from 1966 to 1972, San Jose State from 1973 to 1975, Michigan State from 1976 to 1979, and Arizona State from 1980 to 1984, compiling a career college football record of 129–84–7.

Rogers was then the head coach of the National Football League's Detroit Lions from 1985 to 1988, where his record was 18–40. He went 7–9 in 1985 (with home wins over four playoff teams), 5–11 in 1986, 4–11 in 1987, and 2–9 in 1988, for a career record with the Lions of 18–40. One of his more famous quotes during his unsuccessful tenure with the Lions was when he once wondered aloud to reporters after a loss, "What does a coach have to do around here to get fired?" He was succeeded by Wayne Fontes.

In 1991, Rogers served as head coach of the Winnipeg Blue Bombers of the Canadian Football League (CFL) coaching the Blue Bombers to a 9–9 record and an appearance in the East Final. After the CFL stint, Rogers was named head coach of the Arkansas Miners of the fledgling Professional Spring Football League. However, the league never made it out of its first training camp and folded just ten days before the start of the 1992 season.

Personal life
Living in Friant, California in his final years, Rogers was married for over 50 years. He died on July 10, 2018 in Fresno, California at the age of 84.

Head coaching record

College

NFL

CFL

References

1934 births
2018 deaths
American football defensive backs
American football wide receivers
Arizona State Sun Devils football coaches
Cal State Hayward Pioneers football coaches
Detroit Lions coaches
Fresno State Bulldogs football coaches
Fresno State Bulldogs football players
Michigan State Spartans football coaches
San Jose State Spartans football coaches
Winnipeg Blue Bombers coaches
Junior college football coaches in the United States
Sportspeople from Long Beach, California
Players of American football from Long Beach, California
Players of American football from Los Angeles
Long Beach City Vikings football players
Players of Canadian football from Los Angeles
Sports coaches from Los Angeles
Detroit Lions head coaches